Tayuman Street is a four-lane east-west street in northern Manila, Philippines. It stretches  from the former San Lazaro Hippodrome in Santa Cruz to Barrio Pritil in Tondo district. The street is designated as part of Circumferential Road 2.

Tayuman begins at an intersection with Lacson Avenue in Santa Cruz district fronting SM City San Lazaro. It crosses Rizal Avenue, passing underneath the Tayuman LRT Station where it continues past the headquarters of the Department of Health into the residential areas of Santa Cruz and Tondo. The street ends at Juan Luna Street near Puregold Tayuman supermarket and extends west towards Manila North Harbor in Tondo as Capulong Street.

The street was named after tayum, a type of indigo plant.

Route description 

Tayuman Street is designated a national secondary road, wholly with the route number N140. The road has four lanes, with two per direction, are mostly lined with side streets and local businesses.

Numerous establishments line the road, like the Department of Health Central Office, Puregold Tayuman branch, Sentro ng Karunungan Library, Archdiocesan Shrine of Espiritu Santo, Immaculate Conception Parish Church  and Tayuman Commercial Center. San Lazaro Tourism and Business Park and SM City San Lazaro, both standing on the former location of the San Lazaro Racetrack, which moved to Carmona, Cavite, lies on the east end of the street. Schools also line the street, like the Andres Bonifacio Elementary School (Tayuman cor Ipil Street), Espiritu Santo Parochial School, Manila Cathedral School, and Rizal Elementary School.

Jeepney routes
Tayuman Street
 Tayuman - Pritil
 Tayuman - Lardizabal
 Blumentritt - Divisoria

Intersections Jeepney Route
Gasak - Recto (Oroquieta Street)
Navotas - Recto (Oroquieta Street)
MCU - Recto (Oroquieta Street)
Malanday - Recto (Oroquieta Street)
MCU - Divisoria (Abad Santos Avenue)
Malanday - Divisoria (Abad Santos Avenue)

Intersections

See also
 Major roads in Manila

References

Streets in Manila
Santa Cruz, Manila
Tondo, Manila